Kim Hyun-young (born January 14, 1996) better known by her stage name Joo Hyun-young, is a South Korean actress. She gained recognition for her appearances in comedy-variety show SNL Korea in 2021 and television series Extraordinary Attorney Woo in 2022.

Philanthropy 
On February 12, 2023, Joo donated 30 million won to help 2023 Turkey–Syria earthquake, by donating money through Hope Bridge National Disaster Relief Association.

Filmography

Film

Television series

Web series

Television show

Web show

Awards and nominations

References

External links 

 
 

1996 births
Living people
21st-century South Korean actresses
South Korean television actresses
South Korean film actresses
South Korean web series actresses
Best Variety Performer Female Paeksang Arts Award (television) winners
South Korean women television presenters
Kookmin University alumni